David Gibb may refer to:
 David Gibb (musician) (born 1990), children's musician and songwriter
 David Gibb (mathematician) (1883–1946), Scottish mathematician and astronomer

See also
 David Gibbs (disambiguation)